Sonya L. Robinson (born July 29, 1959) is an American musician and songwriter.

Background
Sonya Robinson is a graduate of Nicolet High School in Milwaukee, Wisconsin and the University of Wisconsin Milwaukee.  In 1983, she was crowned Miss Black America.

Recording Artist
In 1987, she released her first CD, entitled "Sonya" on Columbia Records.  It was produced by Jean-Paul Bourelly.

Miles Davis once compared her violin playing to Stuff Smith and Ray Nance.

References

External links

 Official Facebook page
 Official website

American jazz violinists
Songwriters from Wisconsin
Living people
1959 births
21st-century violinists
African-American beauty pageant winners
African-American women musicians
21st-century African-American people
21st-century African-American women
20th-century African-American people